Warren "Foxy" Fox (also known as Mike Jones) is a fictional character from the British Channel 4 soap opera Hollyoaks, portrayed by Jamie Lomas. The character and casting were announced on 12 May 2006, and Warren made his first appearance on 26 June 2006. He was introduced as an old acquaintance of Sean Kennedy (Matthew Jay Lewis). Lomas opted to leave the series in 2009, with his departure coinciding with the return of Clare Devine (Gemma Bissix). On 17 October 2010, it was announced that Lomas would return to the series, appearing from 29 October 2010. However, Warren left the series for the second time in December 2011.

The character was later reintroduced in May 2016. In November 2017, Lomas confirmed his exit from the soap in hope of pursuing other projects, however the door was left open for the character to return. Warren departed the series for the third time on 8 November 2017. On 30 March 2018, it was announced that Lomas would reprise the role, and Warren returned for a one-off appearance on 22 May 2018. In July 2019 it was announced that Lomas would once again be reprising the role, and Warren returned for a brief appearance on 30 July 2019, before making his full-time return on 8 January 2020.

Warren is a gangster and hard-man who is known for his murderous tendencies making him one of soaps most all time dangerous characters as the character can be linked back to 12 deaths directly and indirectly. The eight murders the character has directly committed himself where that of his former friend and gangster associate, Sean Kennedy (Matthew Jay Lewis), his fiancé, Louise Summers (Roxanne McKee) a former Army member in Dale Greer  who Warren murdered to play dead by changing his clothes onto Dale before dumping Dale's corpse in a burning building (The Loft), Kyle Ryder (Neil Toon), Bart McQueen (Jonny Clarke), Cormac Ranger (James Gaddas),  Brody Hudson (Adam Woodward) and Les The Embalmer.

The character is also behind the events of The II Gnosh fire in November 2010 when he coasted Dominic Reilly (John Pickard) into setting fire to the business which resulted in the deaths of Malachy Fisher (Glen Wallace) and long-term character Steph Cunningham (Carley Stenson) the character then had a hand in covering up two murders, the first in December 2010 was Danny Houston (Darren Day) and the second was Timmy Simmons (Sam Tutty).

The character has also committed several crimes while on the show such as attempted murder, kidnapping, drug dealing, money laundering, intimidation and countless physical assaults. The character also embarked on numerous affairs most notably that of Mercedes McQueen (Jennifer Metcalfe) and Mandy Richardson (Sarah Jayne Dunn). Warren has also embarked on his fair share number of feuds with the likes of Calvin Valentine (Ricky Whittle), Clare Devine (Gemma Bissix), Brendan Brady (Emmett Scanlan), Grace Black (Tamara Wall) and Liam Donovan (Jude Monk McGowan).

Storylines

2006–2011

Warren arrives in Hollyoaks in June 2006 to find Sean. Warren demands money from Sean as compensation for having him jailed, but is willing to write off Sean's debts he owes him in exchange for a night with his wife, Louise Kennedy (Roxanne McKee). Louise refuses to sleep with him, and tells Sean that the only way to settle the debt would be to give Warren ownership of Evissa. Sean agrees. Warren embarks on an affair with Clare Cunningham (Gemma Bissix), whilst she is still married to Max Cunningham (Matt Littler). A passionate rendezvous between them is taped by Mel Burton (Cassie Powney), which she shows to Sam "OB" O'Brien (Darren Jeffries) and Sophie Burton (Connie Powney). Mel and Sophie are killed afterwards, and OB is severely injured, in the explosion at The Dog in the Pond. OB tells Max about the affair and Max fires Warren from The Loft. Warren hires thugs to trash The Loft. Max reluctantly signs his half of The Loft over to Warren. When Clare returns, she and Warren are partners in owning The Loft. However, Warren and Clare dispute. Warren and Calvin Valentine (Ricky Whittle) begin to have a rivalry for Louise's affections.

Mercedes McQueen (Jennifer Metcalfe) sleeps with Warren after being accused of infidelity by her boyfriend, Russ Owen (Stuart Manning). When Warren uncovers Sean's return, demanding £10,000 from Louise, he agrees to help Louise gain the money. However, Warren later kidnaps Sean and kills him. Louise and Calvin end their relationship, and Warren supports her. After sleeping together, Louise guiltily reunites with Calvin. Justin Burton (Chris Fountain) later resides with Warren. Warren is arrested for Sean's murder after Clare alerts the police. He is however released after a failure to find Sean's body. Shortly after, Clare is pushed over the balcony of The Loft in an attempt on her life. Justin witness Warren and Mercedes in bed as he plans to leave with Katy (Hannah Tointon). Justin heads to the train station and is run over by a van. Warren is arrested for the attempt on Clare's life, but is innocent. During his court appearance, Warren is found innocent as Mercedes admits she was with him. Warren visited a hospitalized Justin, revealing he was the assailant who almost killed him and later, Katy is disgusted to learn that Warren killed Sean.

Warren grows fonder of Justin, who begins working for Warren, as Louise and Warren's relationship becomes more serious. Clare continues attempts to drive Louise and Warren apart. However, Warren threatens to push her from the balcony if she does not sign over The Loft to him and leave Hollyoaks, to which she agrees. Days later, Warren returns home to his flat to find it trashed and no sign of Katy. Warren, Justin and Max begin looking for her, and are later called by Clare, who tells them she has Katy. Clare tells Warren that she wants revenge on Justin for pushing her over the balcony. Warren pretends to kill Justin. However, Clare is not fooled, so drives off with Katy tied up in the car. Warren, Max and Justin follow her. As Clare swerves to avoid cyclists, she crashes over a cliff and into water below. Warren, Justin and Max jump in, rescuing Katy. Clare meanwhile, disappears underneath the water, apparently dying. Some time after, Louise is notified that a body has been found, and it may be Sean. Louise identifies the body, but it turns out to not be Sean's. Katy attempts to try to tell Louise that Warren killed Sean, but he ends up proposing to her, to which she accepts. During their engagement party, Louise becomes suspicious of Warren's dealings, and is later attacked in Evissa by Ste Hay (Kieron Richardson), who ends up setting fire to it and leaving Louise for dead. Calvin Valentine (Ricky Whittle) saves Louise, and the next day, Warren beats up Ste.

Following a poker game with Tony Hutchinson (Nick Pickard), Mike Barnes (Tony Hirst) and Darren Osborne (Ashley Taylor Dawson), Warren ends up winning Darren's half of The Dog. Warren tells Louise he has bought her The Dog for Christmas. When they inform Jack (Jimmy McKenna) and Frankie Osborne (Helen Pearson) that they now own a half of The Dog, Jack has a heart attack. As Jack recovers, Frankie goes through the unpleasantness of having to share The Dog with Warren and Louise. Warren's old friends appear at The Dog and hold everyone hostage, which ends with Darren getting shot. Louise feels she cannot trust Warren anymore, but forgives him when he signs back his half of The Dog to the Osbornes. Newt (Nico Mirallegro) and Lauren Valentine (Dominique Jackson) find Sean's body, and Warren confesses to Louise that he killed him. Louise is furious, but becomes more angry when she finds out Katy knew. Louise then exposes Katy and Zak Ramsey's (Kent Riley) affair to Warren. Katy is angry when Louise agrees to become an alibi for Warren on the night of Sean's death as she does not want him to go to prison. Katy tells Warren to admit to the murder but he refuses. Katy decides to leave, but is dragged from a taxi by Louise and Warren. After Warren attempts to convince Katy to stay, she leaves. Louise is later arrested for Sean's murder. Warren and Darren persuade mentally unstable Jake Dean (Kevin Sacre) to confess to Sean's murder, to which he does. Louise is then released.

Mandy Richardson (Sarah Jayne Dunn) and Louise become wedding planners. Mandy then starts to help Warren plan his wedding to Louise. Louise becomes very suspicious of Warren and Mandy, believing they are sleeping together. Cindy Cunningham (Stephanie Waring) pushes Louise further into believing this. Louise turns to alcohol, which finally drives Warren to confide in Mandy and begin an affair. Ravi Roy (Stephen Uppal) ends up finding Mandy and Warren sleeping together on one occasion, but agrees to keep quiet. Nige Foster (Sam Townend) is revealed to be alive, despite Warren telling Calvin, who thinks he killed him, he is dead. Warren pays Nige money to stay hidden so that it keeps Calvin on his side. Calvin agrees to take part in a raid on The Loft after he is approached by DI Mark Gascoyne (Craig Russell). Not having time to warn Warren about the raid, Calvin goes along with Mark and two other officers, whom he later discovers are not police officers and that the raid is unofficial. Mark gets Calvin to beat Warren up as revenge on him after he beat him up. Calvin has to agree, however he phones an ambulance afterwards.

Mandy tells Louise about the affair and the pair plan revenge on Warren, after Louise tells Mandy that Warren killed Sean. They then come up with a plan to steal Warren's money and go to the police about the murder. Louise sees CCTV footage of Warren and Mandy sleeping together in The Loft and decides to murder Warren and frame Mandy. On the wedding day, Warren's foster brother Spencer Gray (Darren John Langford) turns up, stating his mother has died. Warren asks him to be his best man. Warren, Ravi and Spencer arrive at the hotel where the wedding is being held. Warren goes up to Louise's room where he hides a necklace for her, however, he finds the gun which she plans to use to kill him. Warren takes the gun and removes the bullets as Louise returns to the room. He gives her the necklace and asks if the gun was his present. Louise reveals she hates Warren because he had ruined her life, killed her husband and cheated on her. Warren begins crying and apologizes to Louise, telling her that he wants to start a family with her. Louise picks up the gun and tells him she could never bring his child into the world. However, Louise discovers the gun is empty and Warren reveals he has the bullets. Warren attacks Louise for trying to kill him. A struggle breaks out and Warren ends up killing Louise. The wedding party believe Louise left Warren due to his affair, unaware of her death. A heartbroken Warren watches as Mandy leaves the village with Tony. Calvin and his wife, Carmel (Gemma Merna) approach him in an attempt to comfort him. Carmel mentions that Louise was pregnant, leaving Warren devastated.

Warren captures the affections of Sasha Valentine (Nathalie Emmanuel), who Warren asks to help look after Spencer. Warren and Sasha share a kiss. Warren upsets her by having a one-night stand with Sarah Barnes (Loui Batley). However, Warren and Sasha eventually begin a relationship, with Sasha moving in. Calvin makes numerous attempts to stop his sister from seeing Warren, however it only pushes her away. Calvin then records a confession from Warren that he murdered Sean, and also admits to Louise's murder. Mark arrests Warren, but later tells Calvin that the recorder has not worked and that Warren will be released. Calvin goes to see Warren at The Loft and a fight breaks out. The fight gets out of hand when Warren is knocked over The Loft balcony. Sasha breaks them up as onlookers watch. After Calvin announces Warren as a murderer in front of the villagers, Sasha takes Warren's side.

Warren starts to become the victim of a hate campaign with posters spread around the village declaring him to be a murderer. He receives mysterious phone calls and poison pen letters. In an attempt to leave the village with some money, Warren makes a deal with Justin to burn down The Loft for £5,000 so that he can claim the insurance money and Justin can get money to start a new life with Hannah Ashworth (Emma Rigby). Justin agrees and goes to meet Warren at The Loft, but is stopped by Calvin who tells him not to get involved with another of Warren's schemes. Changing his mind Justin leaves only to be seen by Sasha. While waiting for Justin in the club, Warren is knocked out by Clare using a baseball bat. When Warren awakens, he finds himself tied to a chair and is shocked to see that Clare is alive. She tells him that both he and Justin have ruined her life and makes Warren call Justin to meet at The Loft. Calvin then arrives to speak to Warren and finds Warren tied up, Clare with a match and The Loft covered in petrol. He initially proceeds to do the right thing by calling the police, but after Warren taunts Clare by saying that he always wins, Calvin backs off and leaves his fate in Clare's hands. Hannah arrives at The Loft to find Justin, and Clare accidentally knocks her out. She wakes up and attacks Clare, who drops a match onto the bar, the pair fall through the banister to the floor below unconscious. Justin enters The Loft through the upstairs door, where he finds Warren tied up. Justin asks him where Hannah is and Warren tells him that she is not there. Justin starts to untie him but he hears Hannah's calls for help and realizes that Warren lied. He leaves him in the fire and escapes with Hannah. Clare is nowhere to be seen and has escaped. Warren unties himself and realizes he cannot get out of the balcony door so jumps down the cellar door, he lands on his ankle on the stairs and breaks it. Warren looks up at the ceiling mirror and notices the support chains are on fire. They break and the mirror collapses onto Warren, apparently killing him instantly.

Over a year after his supposed death, Warren returns to Hollyoaks in October 2010, revealing he is alive. He breaks into Chez Chez and leaves a dead fox for club owner Cheryl Brady (Bronagh Waugh). The next day, Warren follows Mandy in the village and is seen by Tom Cunningham (Ellis Hollins), who claims to have seen Warren's ghost. Warren is later seen by Tony walking past the village walls. Mandy and Warren meet, revealing they are in a relationship and have had contact since their last encounter. Warren tells Mandy that they are going to destroy Tony, as revenge for him leaving her abroad. On the same night, a fire is started in Il Gnosh by an unseen character and Steph Roach (Carley Stenson) and Malachy Fisher (Glen Wallace) are killed.

The following day, Warren and Mandy argue and she threatens him. Later, Warren enters the McQueens' home where he asks Theresa McQueen (Jorgie Porter) who she has told and mentions that someone else knows, but does not reveal what he is referring to. It is later revealed that Theresa witnessed Warren escaping The Loft and since then, he has been blackmailed. On another occasion, Warren threatens to push Theresa from a roof in the village if she does not tell him who has been blackmailing him. He also reveals how he escaped the fire. In flashback scenes, days before the fire Warren meets a suicidal man named Dale Greer (Chris Geere). Dale and Warren bond and he begins working for him. When Clare starts the fire and Warren is apparently killed by the mirror, the floors collapsed and Warren is found by Dale in the cellar. After being rescued by Dale, Warren realizes everyone believes he is still in the club. Warren kills Dale before putting his body in the cellar. Warren then threatens to kill Theresa, who witnesses him escaping, if she tells anyone and then leaves the village. With Warren still threatening to push her from the walls, Theresa admits she killed Calvin and this forms the beginning of their relationship, as friends, in which they both help protect the other's secret.

Warren breaks into Chez Chez and tries to break the floor with a sledgehammer, however is interrupted by Brendan Brady (Emmett J. Scanlan). Brendan asks who Warren is. Warren lies that he is Cheryl's boyfriend before phoning Mandy for information about him. Warren enters The Dog to the surprise of local residents. Claiming to have suffered from amnesia, Warren pretends to regain some of his memory of several people. Warren later confronts Tony and the pair have a stand off with Tony threatening to attack Warren for telling Dom to burn down his restaurant which resulted in the death of Steph and Malachy. Warren then leaves and Brendan tells Tony to call the police and inform them that Warren is still alive. Warren is later arrested and taken into custody where he is interviewed by DC Ethan Scott (Craig Vye). Warren tells Ethan to speak to his commanding officers and later Warren is released. After returning to the village Warren meets with Cheryl in time for Christmas and she believes he truly has feelings for her. A few days later Warren returns to the club where he starts to dig up the floor. Danny Houston watches Warren doing so on the club's CCTV and calls Brendan. Danny tells Brendan to find out what Warren is up to, believing him to be in league with the police. Brendan then locks Warren in the cellar and asks him to tell him everything but Warren doesn't. Brendan then leaves Warren locked in the cellar until he admits to what he is up to. Warren and Brendan plan to get Danny's half of the club from him however things don't go to plan and Brendan kills Danny. Warren helps Brendan get rid of Danny's body in the pond by the Dog.

Warren finds out that Mandy had been sending him the texts in order for him to come back to Hollyoaks with her. Warren frightens her out the village. When Kyle Ryder (Neil Toon) is due in court Theresa faces prison. In order to stop her being sent down Warren arranges for Kyle to be beaten up meaning the court case has to be postponed. Brendan helps Warren by getting Kyle to escape from the hospital, leaving him to go on the run. Brendan jumps to the wrong conclusions believing that Warren really killed Calvin and that Theresa is taking the blame for him. Brendan pretends to be Warren and encourages Kyle to seek revenge on Theresa, hoping that the truth will come out.

Although Warren is supposed to be with Cheryl, he soon returns his cheating ways when Mitzeee (Rachel Shenton) grabs his attention. Warren doesn't understand why she is interested in Brendan, unknowing their relationship is fake. Warren and Mitzeee almost sleep together but are stopped before they have chance when Cheryl walks in. Cheryl is none the wiser but Brendan cottons on and warns Mitzeee not to make a fool of him.

Warren reassures Theresa when she hears that Kyle is still about, thinking that Brendan has ensured that Kyle has taken the money and run. Warren becomes suspicious when Kyle comes to Chez Chez asking for Warren and Warren later sees him talking to Brendan. Warren does everything he can to persuade Theresa not to leave with her baby in fear of Kyle but she leaves anyway. When Warren phones Theresa and Kyle answers telling him that he is doing what they had arranged Warren realizes that Brendan has been pretending to be him. At first Brendan refuses to tell Warren where Kyle has taken Theresa but when he realizes that Theresa and her baby, Kathleen-Angel might die he tells him. Warren turns up and Kyle knocks him out. Later, Warren has regained consciousness and shoots Kyle in the back not knowing that he is holding Kathleen-Angel, and Kyle falls down the lift shaft with the baby. Theresa is horrified and believes that Warren had been plotting with Kyle all along after what Kyle had said on the phone. Ethan, who had been pushed down the lift shaft by Kyle previously, helps Warren to get Kathleen-Angel out but cannot get out himself. Warren urges Theresa to leave with Carmel and the baby but she doesn't listen and goes back to save Ethan. She falls into the lift shaft while trying and then forces Warren to save Ethan before she lets him save herself. He saves Ethan and then suddenly the lift plummets with Kyle's dead body and Theresa still on top of it.

In hospital as Theresa fights for her life, Carmel accuses Warren of being in love with Theresa and his face leads the audience to think this is true. Warren then makes sure Ethan stays quiet and Theresa says thanks for his help. He then sleeps with Mitzeee and Warren and Brendan have a huge fight. They eventually call a truce until Ste attacks Brendan with a baseball bat, which hospitalized him. Warren then stole drugs from Brendan later in the month and begin a relationship with Mitzeee. When Mitzeee's mother, Trish (Paula Wolfenden), is imprisoned, Ethan agrees to let her go if she gets a confession from Warren admitting to the murder of Louise. She tries to tape record him however Warren finds out. Warren ends up confessing to Mitzeee about Louise's murder. On Hollyoaks Later, Warren is told by Mitzeee to get the truth from him about Mercedes. Warren then organized a prostitute called Honey for Seth Costello (Miles Higson) and Seth sleeps with Honey. Warren finds Seth over Honey's corpse and places her dead body in the forest. The next day, he buries it under ground. He then steals a gun and burns the rival stag clothes. Warren then reveals to Mitzeee that he tricked Seth into believing he had killed Honey. Seth's older brother, Riley (Rob Norbury), then finds out about this and locks Warren down a mine and Warren then gets animal beaten and gets out of the mine. He then almost kills Riley by flooding the stags and his girlfriend Mitzeee. Warren then reveals to Mitzeee he knows the secret and the secret is Mercedes had an affair with Riley's father, Carl Costello (Paul Opacic). When he returns, he visits Brendan in prison and tells him to get used to it.

One night, Mitzeee spends the night at Riley's. Nothing happens but Riley's brother Jason Costello (Victoria Atkin) takes a picture of them together and sends it to Warren. After a fight with Riley, Warren is fuming. Carl and Mitzeee stop him from beating Riley to a pulp, however the Costellos then push Mitzeee too far so she and Warren agree to destroy the Costellos on the day of the wedding. Warren gets Mitzeee an invite to the wedding and makes plans to reveal all at the wedding. He fires Gilly and rehires Rhys within a day. Warren warns Doug that if he reveals the truth, Warren will break his legs, and demands £50,000 from Mercedes and Carl within 24 hours, or he will reveal the truth. Carl gives him 25,000 of it with the other half on condition of the truth not coming out at the wedding. Doug tells Warren he's going to tell the truth but in retaliation Warren throws Doug to the ground and forces him to put copies of Mitzeee's book underneath each chair. Warren sees Doug telling Seth to tell the truth and so Warren attacks Doug and threatens that he will kill him if he reveals the truth. In the end Mercedes tells Riley about the affair at the wedding. After the wedding Warren attacks Doug. Warren visits Brendan in prison to get his share of Chez Chez but Brendan refuses to give it to him so Warren gets him beaten up. When Ethan accidentally runs Rob Edwards (David Atkins) over, Warren helps Ethan repair his vehicle and uses the situation to his advantage for Ethan's help in his dirty games. Mitzeee leaves Warren citing Louise's murder as her reason. Warren gets angry, and chucks Mitzeee's clothes into the river then threatens both Ste and Cheryl but when he threatens new DJ, Joel Dexter (Andrew Still). Joel claims Warren is his father. Warren goes into denial, believing the claim to be either one of Brendan's games or a lie told to Joel by his mother, however Theresa convinces Warren to have a DNA test which shows he is indeed Joel's father. After this happens Brendan returns and he and Warren declare a truce but Warren tells Ethan he is going to kill Brendan and he wants an alibi from him.

Mitzeee and Brendan hatch a plan to get Warren out of the way by uncovering Louise's murder and getting him sent down. Warren tells Mitzeee he wants to marry her but before he agrees to show her Louise's grave, just like she had wanted. Unbeknownst to Mitzeee, Warren has seen past her plan and he forces her to dig Louise's grave. Warren also orders Joel to shoot Brendan and Joel pulls a gun out on Brendan whilst they are in the car, on the way to find Warren and Mitzeee. Warren then begins to strangle Mitzeee when she refuses to keep digging. However, Brendan arrives just in time to save her. Brendan holds Warren at gunpoint and tells him that he shot Joel. Outraged, Warren tackles Brendan to the ground and a fight ensues, in which Warren disarms Brendan. Warren the picks up a brick in an attempt to finish him off. However, Joel arrives and hits Warren with the shovel, revealing Brendan and Joel came to an agreement. The police, who Brendan called, arrive and arrest Warren for Louise's murder. Warren tells Mitzeee he wished he had killed her and tells Joel he is no son of his. Brendan taunts Warren for the last time before he is taken away in a police car.

2016–present
James Nightingale (Gregory Finnegan) gets Warren released early on legal technicalities. He poses as "Mike Jones" to trick Mitzeee's sister, Maxine Minniver (Nikki Sanderson), and starts a relationship with her. He tries to steal a key from her flat which would access hidden money in order to pay legal fees. However, Sienna Blake (Anna Passey) steals the key and blackmails him into helping secure a murder confession from Maxine in exchange for the key. Warren reveals that his real reason for being back in the village is to get vengeance for the death of his sister, Katy. Warren prepares to leave again, but Sienna gives him the key. He stays and they sleep together. Later on, Warren is able to get Maxine to confess that she buried Sienna's father, Patrick Blake's (Jeremy Sheffield) corpse. Warren decides to keep this away from Sienna after discovering how vulnerable Maxine is, but Sienna pushes him and he reveals the truth. They call the police who investigate the city wall, where Patrick was buried. When Maxine returns from the police station, Warren and Sienna announce that they were together to make Maxine confess, making Maxine leave the house. Warren continues his feud with other residents, especially Jack, who he uses a prison mate to scare him. Warren helps rescue Sienna's daughter, Nico Blake (Persephone Swales-Dawson), and her friend Peri Lomax (Ruby O'Donnell) whilst they are trapped in the woods, while camping. The same day, Warren and Sienna begin a relationship follow by her separation with her husband Ben Bradley. Warren sets out on a trip down memory lane, he visits several places in the village relevant to his past. Upon walking around the villages, Warren discovers there is a hate campaign against him started by the Osbornes who have prohibited detailing his murderous past. Warren also tries to bond with Peri's father Cameron Campbell (Cameron Moore) but he tells Warren he knows of his criminal past, which leaves Warren angry. Later, he breaks into the Osbourne's house and sends Jack an anonymous photograph of a Police award on Jack's mantelpiece. Jack arrives home to find Warren standing in his living room. Warren threatens Jack and tells him to ensure the hate campaign stops, otherwise Warren will expose Jack's dark secrets regarding Warren's former cellmate Billy to the rest village. He makes friends with Freddie Roscoe (Charlie Clapham) after hearing on the phone that he needs an engine for his van. Warren tells Freddie he will get him an engine as long as he can have 10% of the cut, so he later steals Dirk Savage's (David Kennedy) engine unknown to Freddie. Despite Freddie threatening to pull the plug on the sale for lack of interest, Warren uses his business acumen and manages to sell the renovated camper van to Mac Nightingale (David Easter) for £18,000. Despite this, Freddie still only offers him 10% of the deal, this angers Warren and he tells Freddie he won't forget his actions. Being aware of the financial difficulty the garage is in, Warren then buys the Roscoe's garage from the bank. Darren, beside himself over the identity of his new employer, turns to Clare's sister, Grace Black (Tamara Wall), for help to get rid of Warren but this doesn't work. Grace then later finds out that Sienna is seeing Warren straight after Sienna told her she will never love anyone as much as she did with Trevor Royle (Greg Wood) who she cheated on behind Grace's back so Grace recruits Darren, Maxine and Tony and three of them go to burn down the garage but Grace tips Warren off about the impending arson attack in a bid to win his trust. Grace invites Warren to the club for a business proposition, she then slides a gun over the table to Warren for protection. Stunned and angered, Warren pushes the gun back and tells her he can get his own. Warren leaves, unaware that she is planning to set him up. She later nicks his keys and phone and texts Sienna to go to the garage, she takes the gun with her and her half-brother Liam Donovan (Maxim Baldry) walks in and she shoots him. Grace and Liam's brother Adam Donovan (Jimmy Essex) thinks it's Warren and so he punches Warren in the restaurant, who retaliates by ramming Adam against the wall. Warren realizes that he is being set up. Liam later gives the police his statement telling them it was Warren who shot him and Warren is arrested.

Warren is released as there is no evidence to prove that he shot Liam, angering Maxine, Darren and Nancy. Warren visits Grace in The Loft and tells her he knows she shot Liam and set him up, Warren grabs her by the arm aggressively and warns her to keep out of his way, having seen a glimpse of his true colors, Grace agrees to stay out of his way. Warren takes full control of the Roscoe garage, renaming it "Warren Wheels". Warren tries to call a truce with Darren and Maxine but Maxine remains reluctant. Warren and Sienna try to call a truce with Darren who willingly accepts. When Darren and Nancy go to the woods in search for Patrick's body, they enter a bunker where Warren who has been following them, locks them inside. Sienna and Warren go to visit a pleading Nancy and Darren but Darren suffers an angina attack. Nancy begs Warren to let Darren our but he refuses to take him to the hospital until he confesses to being part of Patrick's death. Much to Warren's annoyance, Sienna calls the ambulance but Sienna and Warren take Darren and Nancy to the hospital. Warren refuses to let them out of the car unless they confess to Patrick's murder, but Nancy manages to get Darren out of the car. Warren finds out that Maxine is pregnant and believes he is the father. Warren pays a visit to Maxine to find out the truth where he is interrupted by Adam, the two of them fight until Maxine rushes out from behind the bedroom door to save Adam from Warren's anger. Maxine lies to Warren and tells him the baby is Adam's, Warren doesn't believe her and warns her not to lie to him.

Warren enters the garage where DI Ryan Knight (Duncan James) lies in wait. Ryan offers information of the whereabouts of Warren's son, Joel (Rory Douglas-Speed), in return for information on Sienna and Maxine's involvement regarding the Patrick's murder. Warren loses his temper and demands to know where Joel is, Ryan doesn't tell him but leaves his contact card, Warren orders him to leave. Later that day he sees Sienna being hassled by DS Gavin Armstrong (Andrew Hayden-Smith) in the street, Warren confronts DS Armstrong, telling him to back off. Warren realizes the police are turning on Sienna and fears they will twist the evidence in an attempt to fit the murder of Patrick on her. He organizes false two passports for them both to leave the country, he tells Sienna to prepare to flee later that evening. After parting with Sienna, Warren bumps into Joel. Warren asks him whether he is working with Ryan to which Joel denies. Warren tells Joel that Maxine is pregnant and informs him she is his ex-girlfriend, Mitzeee's, sister and that Maxine could go to prison over her involvement in the burial of Patrick's body. Joel reveals he overheard Warren organizing false passports and warns him that he needs to stay around for his and Maxine's baby, he tells Warren if he leaves with Sienna, he'll be a criminal for the rest of his life. Joel leaves and Warren goes to meet his contact to collect the passports, Sienna calls him in a panic, advising him they need to leave immediately, however Warren has a change of heart and tells Sienna he needs to be a dad and stay in Hollyoaks. Sienna is wrongfully imprisoned for Patrick's murder.

Maxine tells Warren that the baby is Adam's so he finds out from the hospital that the baby is his. Warren is determined to be a father again, but Maxine is accidentally locked in the hospital lift by Nico and Peri, thinking it is Cameron. Maxine later loses the baby and Warren overhears Nico on the phone to Peri so he angrily confronts her; panicked Nico tells Warren it was Cameron who did it so Warren takes Leela's phone and he locks him and Cameron in the lift, telling Cameron he has hurt Leela. 
Warren then attacks him but Maxine stops him. Maxine later finds out it was Nico and tells Warren that Nico killed Carly Bradley and Trevor and that she thinks Sienna Is covering up for Nico's involvement in Patrick's death. 
The two later go to see Sienna and Warren tells her he knows everything that Nico has done. 
They convince Sienna to retract her statement. Sienna gets out of jail and the two try to find Nico, meanwhile Sienna gets a phone call from Peri, telling Sienna Tom is in danger. Warren goes to find them with the help of Sienna. Worried for Sienna's safety, Warren tells her to go home and that he will find Tom. Later the maze at the Halloween Spooktacular is set on fire by Cameron, who realizes Nico is inside. Warren realizes Sienna is in the maze looking for Nico, so he rushes in and sees Sienna and Nico are in danger. He saves Sienna despite her pleas for him to save Nico. The maze collapses on top of Nico, apparently killing her.

In the days following Nico's death, Sienna refuses to forgive Warren for ignoring her plea to save. 
Some time before, it was revealed that Joel was the one who gave Katy the drugs that killed her however he panics, and tells Warren it was Bart and Bart agrees to go along with this as long as Joel helps him with money to leave the village. 
After many arguments, Warren takes Sienna back when she reveals she is pregnant and the baby is his, after a pregnancy scare it is revealed they are having twins. 
When Bart is arrested for a different crime, Warren arranges for James to get him out of police custody so that he can kill him.  Bart is on his way round to Warren's to tell him what really happened to Katy, When Warren sees him at the doors, he grabs him and pulls him inside, before killing him off screen. 
Sienna later helps him to get rid of the body. Warren begins an affair with Grace Black (Tamara Wall) behind Sienna's back. Sienna later reveals she has cancer and needs an operation therefore Warren ends his affair with Grace. Warren begins to get blackmailed by a mysterious stalker threatening him to pay them £3000 or they will expose his affair with Grace. This continues until a final showdown on the roof of Dee Valley Hospital where the stalker is revealed to be Mandy.

On his wedding day to Sienna following a confrontation with Grace in The Loft, Grace stabs him in the back and he is hospitalized. Weeks later, Grace tries to get into Sienna's head about Warren's villainous ways, which eventually leads Sienna at attempt to flee Hollyoaks with the help of Grace and Glenn Donovan to get away from Warren, but her plan fails. 
This leads to Warren holding her hostage in his plush countryside house while 9 months pregnant. 
As she goes into labourKim Butterfield (Daisy Wood-Davis) and Farrah Maalik (Krupa Pattani) locate Sienna and arrive there to save her, but Warren catches them. 
They argue but soon come to an agreement to take Sienna to the hospital after Warren learns that she still has cancer where she gave birth to two healthy babies. 
After the babies are born, Sienna tells Warren to leave and never come back or she will tell the police everything he has done, including kidnapping her and murdering Bart. He packs his bags and says goodbye to his son Joel. Moments later Myra McQueen (Nicole Barber-Lane) walks into Esther's Magic Bean and shows Warren the video of Joel giving his sister the drugs that killed her. 
Warren knocks Joel out and ties him up in the garage. As he is about to kill him, Tony Hutchinson runs in and talks some sense into him.
He relents and Joel is let go safely. Warren later secretly goes to the hospital to say goodbye to his babies, but instead he kidnaps Sophie (renaming her Katy, after his deceased sister) packs her in the car and leaves the village for good.

A year later, believing Sienna is dead following a faux police announcement to draw out Nico, Warren returns to the village to kidnap his son Sebastian. He locates Sienna and Nico on the roof of Hollyoaks Hospital and tricks Sienna by selling her a future in Spain, asking her to choose between a life with him and the twins, or Nico. Sienna chooses Warren and Nico attacks her in a jealous rage, Warren picks up Sebastian and makes for the stairwell door, before locking it from the inside.

In July 2019 Warren returns, after Sienna attempting to kidnap the twin after identifying them during a hotel stay. Nina Robertson then gives the twin to Warren and he fires Nina as an au pair and drives away, stating that Sienna will never get the better of him.

Warren returns to the village in 2020, after Sebestian falls ill. He kidnaps Brody to blackmail Sienna into donating her bone marrow to save him. Although Warren agrees to move back to the village so he and Sienna can co-parent the twins, he actually plans to leave as soon as Sebestian is cured. However it turns out that because Sienna had chemotherapy due to her cervical cancer, she can no longer donate bone marrow. However, when he discover that she takes their twins away from him, and being trick by his son and Brody, he is angry. It was reveal that Sienna's reason of taking Sophie and Sebastian away is to protect them from Warren and to recovery Sebastian illness. Warren goes on a search party with Brody and Joel to track down Sienna but when he ends up at his childhood home town he is reminded and opens up to his past that he was bullied by someone called Felix Westwood (Richard Blackwood), after this Warren calls a truce with Brody and returns to Hollyoaks where he stays at The Dog and starts a lustful relationship with Mercedes and this leads Warren to then have a feud with fellow gangster Liam Donovan (Jude Monk McGowan) after Warren gives Liam a scare Liam leads Warren into a trap into beating him up so he can be sent to Prison, Warren does this and is sent back inside however is released due to Liam being the instigator threw texts Warren prepares to hunt Liam down and kill him but Liam hides out after overhearing Warren and orders Warren to be beat up by his men which Hospitalizes Warren. Warren awakens and tracks Liam down who is hosting a 'Devils Dinner Party', Warren breaks in and beats up Laim and everyone leaves as Warren takes Liam's gun. Liam is then killed by Grace which ends the dispute between Warren and Liam.

Sienna later returns and Warren persuades her to stay when he gives her a taped confession at the time of all five of the murders he has committed but at the same time Warren is shocked when he sees that Felix is in Hollyoaks. After seeing Felix for the first time in years, Warren punches Felix and the two have a number of clashes, but Felix tells Warren that the man Warren looked up too as a child, Cormac Ranger (James Gaddass) had abused him in the children home because of his race. Warren vows to help Felix get closure, and with Brody, they arrange a meeting with Cormac. This confrontation turns violent, and Warren ends up beating Cormac half to death. He is left in a coma for months, and eventually dies from a heart attack. Following Cormac's death, Warren starts an affair with Sienna, but when Brody finds out, he punches Warren and ends his relationship with Sienna. Warren then turns back to a life of crime when he is approached by Brad King (Tom Benedict Knight) to help him steal very expensive laptops. Warren later finds himself entangled with Fergus Collins (Robert Beck) another dangerous gangster, and ends up mixed up in all sorts of crimes, involving burglary, illegal filming of women (although he was unaware of this) and tricking numerous Hollyoaks residents out of their businesses and homes.

Cormac's death is revisited when his daughter Summer Ranger (Rhiannon Clements) plans retribution for her father's murder. Warren overhears Brody telling Summer (who is threatening Brody and Sienna's lives with a gun) that he will go to the police and confess his and Warren's involvement in Cormac's death, in return for her sparing their lives. Instead of trying to save them, Warren rushes back to the garage where he meets Fergus, who unknowingly convinces him to murder Brody. Warren grabs a car and runs over Brody after he and Sienna escape Summer's grasp. Warren feels guilty afterwards, but covers up any of his involvement in Brody's murder. He comforts and even sleeps with Sienna. Warren's murderous secret is exposed by Fergus after he intercepts an incriminating voicemail, but he agrees to keep his secret.

Fergus is angry with Warren, who refuses to help him with his illegal jobs, even though he kept his secret. Warren reminds Fergus that he is top dog and no-one orders him around, which prompts Fergus to prove he is just as dangerous as Warren by shooting his tech guy Timmy Simmons (Sam Tutty) dead with Warren's gun. Warren is forced to help him dispose of the body and they bury him in the woods. Felix cottons on the Warren and Fergus' crimes, and tries to make Warren see that Fergus is using him. Warren refuses to believe it, and Fergus manipulates him into murdering Felix. Warren refrains after his son Joel Dexter reveals he has been hacking Fergus.

Together with Joel and Felix, Warren finally learns that Fergus has been using him and is the owner of "Operation BlueBird" which is a camera operation of the Dark Web that spies on various women including some of Hollyoaks female residents. Fergus realizes the net is closing in and makes an escape plan, involving trafficking Maxine, going on the run with Trish and framing Warren for all of his crimes. Fergus succeeds in framing Warren, but is killed by Maxine when he threatens Trish. Warren is sent to jail when Fergus' insurance policy of him burying Timmy is sent to the police by his lawyer. Warren accidentally confesses to Honour Chen-Williams, his prison therapist, that he murdered Brody. She is bound by patient confidentiality, so she keeps his secret.

Maxine and Sienna fight to prove Warren's innocence, but he is later released when the police fail to find Timmy's body. A mystery person breaks into Honour's home and steals Warren's files, which reveal that he killed Brody. This mystery person runs over Warren as revenge, and it is later revealed to be Joel, who is sick and tired of his father committing evil acts and getting away with them. Warren vows to change his ways, but following his hit-and-run, he becomes addicted to painkillers. He accepts help from his loved ones, after almost killing his own kids in a fire. Warren beats up Ethan Williams (Matthew James-Bailey) when Ethan attempts to attack Warren as revenge for Warren beating up his nephew Sam Chen-Williams weeks prior. However, Warren strikes a deal with Ethan that he will spare he and his families lives if he helps him track down the hit and run driver that left him for dead.

Warren would soon eventually meet a fellow dangerous gangster in Norma Crow (Glynis Barber) also known as "The Undertaker" when she kidnaps Warren's children. Warren's fury and ruthless reputation leaves a positive impression on Norma who wants to recruit Warren to work for her. During this, Sienna discovers Warren killed Brody and plots to kill him. After poisoning and getting the confession out of Warren, he attempts to kill her before he is hit with a wheel wrench by Damon seemingly killing him instantly. However, after Sienna and Damon 'dispose' of Warren's body they're unaware they are being watched and a mystery person finds Warren who, in fact, is revealed to be alive. It's revealed the mystery person is Norma, and Warren later plans to get Sienna back by slowly poisoning her. However, he gets second thoughts of killing when Norma sends her hitman, Les also known as "The Embalmer" to kill Sienna, Warren is happy to see Sienna is okay but realises that Liberty is in danger, Warren saves Liberty by throwing out Les, and he and Sienna have a heated confrontation where Norma steps in and tells the pair they are not to harm one another unless she says so. Warren is told by Norma that she's managed to track do the guy who left Warren for dead earlier in the year, Warren (not realising, Norma is purposely setting him upto kill his own son Joel), demands to know the whereabouts of the guy to which Norma tells him they are at a church, Warren retrieves his gun and goes to the location Norma gave him with the intent to shoot this person dead, Warren catches Joel unknowingly its him and shoots him but is shock when Sienna rushes in and he sees Joel, Warren is beside himself with shock and then guilt but Warren is told by Joel that he did run him over Warren considers finishing off Joel but after Joel lies to the police that he didn't see who shot him, Warren decides they're even but after realising Norma attempted to set him up to kill his own child, Warren loads his gun once more while on the phone to Norma vowing that he's coming for her. Warren then kidnaps Norma's associate, Godfrey in a bid to get Norma's attention which works, Warren armed with a gun demands to know what Norma was playing at but Warren is managed to be talked round by Norma that it was nothing more than a misunderstanding. Warren sees through Norma's lies when Joel receives another threat from Norma, and this leads Warren to set out to kill Norma. Warren confronts Norma and prepares to kill her; however, Warren is stunned when Norma begins to talk about his blue eyes and that his father had brown eyes. Warren demands to know what Norma is talking about to which she reveals that she is his estranged biological mother. Warren is left stunned and tries to process this and realises Norma is telling the truth. But when one of Norma's contacts from the police arrive and attempts to break between Warren and Norma. Warren and Norma both fall from a height, and the two are taken to a hospital but survive. Warren vows that he's going to get the truth from Norma then kill her only for Norma to react and later have Warren kidnapped and locked away in a room. Warren is let go by Norma who tests how ruthless Warren can be when she belittles him and tells him that Katy was the only child that she cared for and not him. Eventually, Warren picks up a gun and pulls the trigger only to realise that it's not loaded, and Norma was testing him. Warren then later signs into a partnership with Norma and owns half of all her criminal contacts and businesses. Warren later reveals to Felix that he's dying from liver disease caused by his pain killer addiction, and he only agreed to go into partnership with Norma so he can take it all from her and watch her suffer due to leaving him in a home. Warren is pleased when Norma offers to get tested to be a match for him, but Warren is told by Norma that she's being threatened by a guy called "Turner". Warren who is declining in health enlists the help of Grace when Norma is kidnapped by Turner it's revealed that Turner is in fact Les who has recruited Godfrey. Warren is shocked at Godfrey's betrayal but laughs at Les attempting to be some gangland mastermind. Warren later enters into a struggle with Les after Godfrey does a u-turn at the last second and knocks a gun out of Les' hand as he was about to shoot Warren and Grace. Warren manages to retrieve the gun during the struggle and shoots Les dead without any hesitation. 

Warren has a health scare and is taken to a hospital and is told his condition is becoming worse. Despite his health issues Warren wants to take on a job with Grace and double cross a gangster named Angus and take his counterfeit money they agree to do the deal at The Loft, but Warren purposely locks Grace in the office. A Grace who is armed with a gun incase things turn violent, and they do when Warren meets with Angus and becomes aggressive however Angus manages to get his men to come with him and they arrive just as Warren turns aggressive towards Angus. Warren engages in a fight with the men, but the men are scared off by a gunshot caused by Grace. Warren managed to still fight the men despite his condition, but this leaves him in a bad way and his taking to a hospital once again. Warren is left furious when he sees Norma giving Angus a car as a way of an apology and for Angus not to go after Warren.

After its revealed that both Joel and Norma are not matches for Warren. Warren decides his fate is sealed baring a miracle but its infact revealed that Norma is infact a match for Warren and Grace infact payed off a Doctor to fake the results so she can take Warren's place to run Norma's empire. Just as Warren's on deaths door. Norma finds out the truth and kills Doctor Fenton. Warren is also furious to learn of Grace's double crossing and undergoes surgery and is given his new liver. After the surgery Warren clears the air with Norma as he revealed his plan to her that he was going to take her businesses from her however Norma is understanding and the two agree to move on and give things a go in the son and mother relationship but Warren is told by Norma that Sienna also knew that Grace lied about the test results and despite Warren lying to Grace that they are on good terms Warren vows to kill Grace and goes on a warpath especially when he discovers that Norma only wants Grace to sign The Loft over to her. Warren later threatens Grace and her loved ones if she does not comply to the demands. Warren punches Ethan when he discovers that he is moving in with Sienna but apologises and agrees to get the twins onside in a bid to get them to live with him over Sienna. Warren has another brief health scare when he collapses and is taking to a hospital and is told he could be rejecting his new liver. However, it's nothing more than a case of Warren just needing a course of stronger antibiotics. Warren then focuses on getting the twins on his side.

Development

Introduction
In May 2006, it was announced former Dream Team actor Jamie Lomas would arrive in Hollyoaks as "bad boy" Warren Fox. Along with his casting, it was announced his former Dream Team co-star Ricky Whittle would take on the part of "mysterious" Calvin Valentine. Speaking of Lomas and Whittle's casting, a Hollyoaks spokesperson stated: "We're delighted to welcome Ricky and Jamie to the Hollyoaks cast. Their characters are set to bring lots of drama to the show!" Warren immediately showed a confrontational personality from his original appearance on Hollyoaks. He always put himself first, and would do anything to get what he wants involving money, women and business opportunities. Warren is selfish, arrogant and devious.

Fire stunt and fake death
In 2009, Jamie Lomas decided to quit the soap after three years. Speaking of his decision, Lomas stated: "I've had a fantastic three years at Hollyoaks but having fully explored the character, I felt the time was right for me to move on. I'm delighted to be going out as part of such a dramatic storyline and my final scenes are some of the most dramatic I've ever filmed. I'm sure viewers will be hooked!" He continued to say: "I've had a great time playing Warren and have thoroughly enjoyed being part of the Hollyoaks cast where I've made some brilliant friends and worked with some great people."

Following the announcement of Warren's return in October 2010, Jamie Lomas was asked whether he thought the character would have changed since his last appearance. He replied, "I don't think you can really change a character like Warren. I think it would be a little boring if he came back as some sort of softie but, like I say, there are new people around now for him to bounce off."

During an interview with Digital Spy, Lomas admitted he initially wanted to stay on the show for only two years: "Well I wanted to go after two years. I sat down with Bryan Kirkwood who told me what he had in store and it was too good to refuse! The storyline was so fantastic." He later revealed how he felt about his final appearance, admitting: "To be honest with you, when I knew I was filming my final scene – obviously I've spent three years of my life there and I've got lots of good friends there – I got really emotional. I had to take myself off and have a word with myself and say 'Come on – you need to pull it together!' It was great because all the producers came down and clapped me and bought me a bottle of champagne. It was very emotional." Lomas's final appearance as Warren also saw the return of Gemma Bissix's character, and Warren's enemy, Clare Devine, and featured a fire in The Loft, which caused Warren's death.

In October 2010, it was announced Lomas would be reintroduced to Hollyoaks in late 2010, when it is revealed that he in fact survived the fire. Series producer Paul Marquess commented on Warren's return, saying: "We were hopeful that Jamie's return would be the best-kept secret in soap history, but when Jamie arrived on set it proved impossible. When Warren Fox died in the Loft fire, we all thought that was the end of the dangerous gangster that terrorized the residents of Hollyoaks village. But when our writers made the shocking suggestion to bring back Warren in a juicy plot, it was just too irresistible to ignore as they not only made it feasible that Warren could have escaped the fire and fled the village, they created an explosive and very clever plot with lots of twists and turns that is guaranteed to have the audience hooked. When the idea was pitched to Jamie, he knew it was too good an opportunity to miss. Warren Fox was one of the soap's most memorable villains and we're very excited about his return." He returned on 29 October 2010. Lomas later expressed his feelings about returning, saying: "I'm really excited. I got the call and I got told about the storyline and it was great – full of twists and turns. I kind of thought that my character had run his course with the other characters that were around before, but there's a new breed in now, so that means plenty of potential for Warren to come back in and cause some more mayhem." Speaking of the explanation for Warren surviving, Lomas said, "The saving grace was that they never actually saw my body – all they saw was me getting hit by a mirror. So we're going to do a whole storyline on how Warren got out, what happened and whose body it was that they found badly burnt. It's really exciting and I think the fans are going to love it." On-screen, flashback sequences were filmed to show how Warren survived the fire. Hollyoaks announced a special episode centered around Warren and how he survived the fire to be broadcast on 1 December 2010, shown to viewers in various flashbacks.

2011 departure
In August 2011, it was announced that Lomas had decided to leave the serial once again. Lomas filmed his final scenes in October 2011. His departure was broadcast on 23 December 2011.

2016 reintroduction
In March 2016, it was confirmed that Lomas had agreed to reprise his role of Warren, after many rumors had previously circulated over the possibility of these events. The character returned in reasonable fashion where Warren was seen in a "sexy shower stunt". He returned on 26 May.

Third departure and return
In November 2017, the character departed in a storyline which saw him leave with his new-born daughter.

The character then made brief returns in 2018 and 2019 before returning permanently in 2020.

Reception
During The British Soap Awards, Jamie Lomas has been nominated for several awards for his portrayal of the character, including 'Sexiest Male' in 2008, 'Villain of the Year' in 2007, 2008, 2009 and 2011 'Best Actor' in 2008 and 2009. He has also been nominated at the Inside Soap Awards for 'Best Bad Boy' in 2007 and 2008 and also 'Best Actor' in 2009. The character was selected as one of the "top 100 British soap characters" by industry experts for a poll to be run by What's on TV, with readers able to vote for their favorite character to discover "Who is Soap's greatest Legend?" In August 2017, Lomas was long-listed for Best Actor and Best Bad Boy at the Inside Soap Awards. Lomas made the viewer-voted shortlist for the Best Bad Boy accolade, but lost out to Connor McIntyre, who portrays Pat Phelan in Coronation Street.

Ruth Deller of entertainment website Lowculture has often criticized Warren; in one feature she slammed his final storylines stating: "Apparently he's still around and there's some tedious and unlikely 'romance' between him and Sasha. Oh, and he's bedded Swimbint (Sarah Barnes) for good measure. Really, didn't this character's point expire about two years ago now?"

Gareth McLean of Radio Times has been critical of Warren stating: "There are many bad apples in Hollyoaks, but only one that's rotten to the core. Warren Fox has caused so much misery to so many people – Russ, Mercedes, Ste, Cindy, the Barneses, the Deans and don't forget Justin – it's a wonder the villagers haven't ganged up, Murder on the Orient Express-style, and offed him."

References

External links
 Character profile on the Channel 4 website

Television characters introduced in 2006
Hollyoaks characters
Fictional murderers
Fictional drug dealers
Adoptee characters in television
Fictional gangsters
Fictional businesspeople
Fictional criminals in soap operas
Fictional kidnappers
Male villains
Fictional prisoners and detainees
Male characters in television
Fictional characters incorrectly presumed dead